The Daily News is an English-language newspaper in Sri Lanka. It is now published by the Associated Newspapers of Ceylon Limited (Lake House), a government-owned corporation. The newspaper commenced publishing on 3 January 1918. D. R. Wijewardena was its founder.

The present-day newspaper is written as a broadsheet, with photographs printed both in color and black and white. Weekday printings include the main section, containing news on national affairs, international affairs, business, political analysis, sports, editorials and opinions. Every Thursday issue a free supplement in a tabloid paper called "Wisdom". In addition, the Daily News also provides The Sri Lanka Gazette as a supplement on every Friday. The current editor-in-chief of the daily news is Lalith Allahakkoon.

Since its founding, the Daily News has been housed and printed in the historic, colonial-era Lakehouse Building, adjacent to Beira Lake, in the Fort district of Colombo. 

During the 2018 Sri Lankan Constitutional Crisis, loyalists of former President Mahinda Rajapaksa seized control of the Daily News and ousted journalists who were viewed as supporters of the new regime.

See also
List of newspapers in Sri Lanka

References

External links
 Daily News official website

Associated Newspapers of Ceylon Limited
Daily newspapers published in Sri Lanka
English-language newspapers published in Sri Lanka
Publications established in 1918